Vinduet (Norwegian: The Window) is an online literary magazine. It was a print publication between 1947 and 2021. Its first issue as purely an online publication was started in Autumn 2021. The magazine is based in Oslo, Norway.

History and profile
Vinduet was founded in 1947 by Harald Grieg and Nic. Stang. The owner is the publishing house Gyldendal Norsk Forlag. Four paper editions were issued annually.

In the 1960s Vinduet adopted the eclectic thinking in dealing with literary work. At the end of this period it was under the influence of younger leftist intellectuals. The magazine presents fictional texts, articles about various kinds of literature, and book reviews.

Editors-in-chief
Nikolaj Frobenius was the editor-in-chief of the magazine at the end of the 1990s. From 2008 to 2013 Audun Vinger served in the post, and Kaja Schjerven Mollerin took over after him. Jan Kjærstad and Preben Jordal also served as the editors-in-chief of Vinduet. As of April 2021 the editors-in-chief were Simen V. Gonsholt and Ola Innset.

See also
List of magazines in Norway
List of literary magazines

References

External links
 

1947 establishments in Norway
2021 establishments in Norway
Book review magazines
Defunct literary magazines published in Europe
Defunct magazines published in Norway
Literary magazines published in Norway
Magazines established in 1947
Magazines disestablished in 2021
Magazines published in Oslo
Norwegian-language magazines
Online literary magazines
Online magazines with defunct print editions
Quarterly magazines published in Norway